Friedrich Edouard Heinrich Wulf Krichauff (15 December 1824 – 29 September 1904) was a politician in colonial South Australia.

Krichauff was born in Schleswig, Schleswig-Holstein, Germany, the son of Carl Krichauff, a judge of the Supreme Court of the Duchy of Schleswig, and his wife Julie, née von Bertouch.

Having passed through the State colleges of Schleswig and Husum, Krichauff served three years as an apprentice at the botanic gardens in connection with the University of Kiel. In 1846 he matriculated at the University of Berlin, and passed first class at examinations in Kiel. As a result, he was allowed a stipend by the Danish Government to travel as gardener and botanist; but the war of 1848 prevented him from enjoying this privilege.

Krichauff went to South Australia in December 1848, and settled at Bugle Ranges in the Adelaide Hills, east of the city of Adelaide. Krichauff was one of a number of influential German-speaking residents  such as William Blandowski, Ludwig Becker, Hermann Beckler, Amalie Dietrich, Diedrich Henne, Gerard Krefft, Johann Luehmann, Johann Menge, Carl Mücke (a.k.a. Muecke), Ludwig Preiss, Carl Ludwig Christian Rümker (a.k.a. Ruemker), Moritz Richard Schomburgk, Richard Wolfgang Semon, George Ulrich, Eugene von Guérard, Robert von Lendenfeld, Ferdinand von Mueller, Georg von Neumayer, and Carl Wilhelmi  who brought their "epistemic traditions" to Australia, and not only became "deeply entangled with the Australian colonial project", but also "intricately involved in imagining, knowing and shaping colonial Australia" (Barrett, et al., 2018, p.2).

For many years he was the chairman of the District Council of Macclesfield, as well of the District Council of Strathalbyn. He was elected to the South Australian House of Assembly for Mount Barker on 9 March 1857, but resigned on 12 March 1858. He was again elected to the House, this time for Onkaparinga on 5 April 1870, serving until 22 May 1882, when he resigned his seat to travel in Europe and America. After his return he was elected to the Assembly for the district of Victoria (8 April 1884), and continued to represent the constituency until his retirement from the House at the 1890 colonial election.

Krichauff briefly served as a Minister in May 1870, when he was Commissioner of Public Works for twenty days in Henry Strangways' reconstructed Cabinet. He was returned to the South Australian Legislative Council in June 1890 for the Southern District, holding the seat until 18 May 1894.

Krichauff married Dora Fischer at Bugle Ranges on 10 May 1853. He died in Norwood, Adelaide, South Australia, Australia on 29 September 1904.

Edward William Krichauff (1858 – 22 December 1925), a trustee of the State Bank of South Australia, was a son.

See also
Friedrich C. Krichauff, his son.

Notes

References
 Barrett, L., Eckstein, L., Hurley, A.W. & Schwarz A. (2018), "Remembering German-Australian Colonial Entanglement: An Introduction", Postcolonial Studies, Vol.21, No.1, (January 2018), pp.1-5. 
 Detailed report about the Finke River Mission (Hermannsburg), compiled in 1885 from data supplied by Pastor Kempe and a letter by Pastor Schwarz.

|-

|-

|-

|-

1824 births
1904 deaths
German-Australian Forty-Eighters
German emigrants to Australia
Members of the South Australian House of Assembly
Members of the South Australian Legislative Council
19th-century Australian politicians
People from Schleswig, Schleswig-Holstein